The 2011–12 College of Charleston Cougars men's basketball team represents the College of Charleston in the 2011–12 college basketball season. This is head coach Bobby Cremins's sixth season at College of Charleston. The Cougars compete in the Southern Conference and play their home games at Carolina First Arena.

Following the Cougars loss to Furman on January 26, Cremins announced a medical leave of absence to deal with an unspecified condition.

Roster

Schedule and results

|-
!colspan=12 style=| Exhibition

|-
!colspan=12 style=| Regular season

|- 
!colspan=12 style=| Southern Conference tournament

References

College of Charleston
College of Charleston Cougars men's basketball seasons
Charleston
Charleston